The 1973–74 English Hockey League season took place from September 1973 until May 1974.

The principal event was the Men's Cup (National Clubs Championship) which was won by Southgate.

The vast majority of the season consisted of regional leagues. The first National League tournament (The National Inter League Championship) would not be introduced until September 1975.

Men's Cup (Benson & Hedges National Clubs Championship)

Quarter-finals

Semi-finals

Final
(Held at Luton on 19 May) 

Southgate
David Owen, David Collison, David Whitaker, Anthony Ekins, Ian McGinn, Bernie Cotton, P J White (J V Knight sub), Michael Corby, Michael Crowe, John Walker, James Neale 
Bedfordshire Eagles
P K Ball, M W Blake, T J Machin, D Bunyan, Brajinder Daved, P Goodyear, P Ellis, K N Tubby, S Sharma, M Kavanagh, C M Hodge (G Player sub)

References

1973
field hockey
field hockey
1973 in field hockey
1974 in field hockey